Colon dentatum is a species of round fungus beetle in the family Leiodidae. It is found in North America.

References

Further reading

 
 

Leiodidae
Articles created by Qbugbot
Beetles described in 1853